The 2007 Woking Council election took place on 3 May 2007 to elect members of Woking Borough Council in Surrey, England. One third of the council was up for election and the Conservative Party gained overall control of the council from no overall control.

After the election, the composition of the council was:
Conservative 19
Liberal Democrat 17

Campaign
The election saw 12 seats being contested with 2 sitting councillors standing down, Neville Hinks in Knaphill ward and Mehala Gosling in West Byfleet. Both the Liberal Democrats and Conservatives were hoping to win control of the council, with the Liberal Democrats needing 1 more seat and the Conservatives 4. Labour were defending 3 seats which were all threatened by either the Conservatives or Liberal Democrats. The other parties standing in the election were the United Kingdom Independence Party, which was standing in more seats than Labour, and the UK Community Issues Party.

The Conservative campaign was described as being the strongest in years with the seats in Horsell and Knaphill being seen as critical in deciding who would control the council.

Election result
The Conservatives won the election gaining a majority on the council, the first time any party had a majority since 1998 and the first time the Conservatives had held a majority since 1994. The Conservatives gained 4 seats in Kingfield and Westfield, Maybury and Sheerwater, Knaphill and Horsell to hold 19 seats compared to 17 for the Liberal Democrats. Meanwhile, Labour lost all 3 of their seats on the council including the party leader, Peter Ford, who lost in Old Woking to the Liberal Democrats. This was the first time Labour had ever failed to have any councillors on Woking council.

The Conservatives won almost 51% of the vote compared to their closest challengers, the Liberal Democrats, on just over 35%, with overall turnout in the election being 43.60%. Following the election the Conservative Anne Murray was expected to take over as leader of the council from Liberal Democrat Sue Smith.

Ward results

References

2007
2007 English local elections
2000s in Surrey